Thomas Chaparro Alvarez (born November 26, 1974) is a Mexican actor, comedian, television host and singer.

Filmography

References

External links
 

1974 births
Living people
20th-century Mexican male actors
20th-century Mexican male singers
21st-century Mexican male actors
21st-century Mexican male singers
Big Brother (franchise) winners
Mexican male comedians
Mexican male film actors
Mexican male television actors
Mexican television talk show hosts
People from Chihuahua City
People from Chihuahua (state)
Reality show winners